Jane Elizabeth Harris (c.1853 – 18 September 1942) was a New Zealand writer, lecturer and spiritualist. She was born in London, England on c.1853.

References

1853 births
1942 deaths
New Zealand academics
New Zealand writers
New Zealand women writers
English emigrants to New Zealand